James C. Y. Chu (born 1935) is a Taiwanese politician and diplomat. He led the Overseas Community Affairs Council from 1996 to 1998 and was later named the representative of the Republic of China to Sweden.

References

1935 births
Living people
Representatives of Taiwan to Sweden
Government ministers of Taiwan